Risoba is a genus of moths of the family Nolidae erected by Frederic Moore in 1881.

Description
Its palpi are upturned and reach the vertex of the head. Antennae almost as long as forewing, with fasciculated (bundled) cilia in male. Thorax and abdomen smoothly scaled, latter long. Tibia smooth and spineless. Forewings without raised tufts and rectangular apex. Cilia non-crenulate. Retinaculum of male bar shaped and claspers long and elongate.

Species
Risoba avola Bethune-Baker, 1906
Risoba basalis Moore, 1882
Risoba becki Kobes, 2006 (Sumatra)
Risoba caeruleata Holloway, 2003
Risoba calaina Zerny, 1916
Risoba calainigrata Holloway, 2003
Risoba calainodes A. E. Prout, 1928
Risoba chlora Hampson, 1912
Risoba delicata Bethune-Baker, 1906
Risoba diehli Kobes, 1982
Risoba diphteroides Hampson, 1898
Risoba diphtheropsis A. E. Prout, 1924
Risoba diplogramma Hampson, 1912
Risoba diversipennis (Walker, 1858)
Risoba flavipennis Hampson, 1895
Risoba glauca Hampson, 1912
Risoba guichardi Holloway, 2003
Risoba harmani Holloway, 2003 (Borneo, Brunei, Indonesia)
Risoba helbaueri Kobes, 2006 (Sumatra)
Risoba hiemischi Kobes, 2006 (Sumatra)
Risoba hollowayi Kobes, 2006 (Sumatra)
Risoba jucunda (Walker, 1862)
Risoba kebea Bethune-Baker, 1906
Risoba lunata (Möschler, 1887) (Ghana, Congo, Nigeria)
Risoba malagasy (Viette, 1965) (Madagascar)
Risoba martinii Holloway, 2003
Risoba menhoferi Kobes, 2006 (Sumatra)
Risoba obscurivialis Holloway, 2003
Risoba obstructa Moore, 1881
Risoba olivens Bethune-Baker, 1906
Risoba orientalis Holloway, 1976
Risoba ornata Wileman & West, 1929
Risoba owgarra A. E. Prout, 1921
Risoba pratti Bethune-Baker, 1906
Risoba prominens Moore, 1881 (Nepal to Japan/New Guinea)
Risoba rafflesae Kobes, 2006 (Sumatra)
Risoba rectilinea Draudt, 1950 (China)
Risoba repugnans (Walker, 1856)
Risoba rothei Kobes, 2006 (Sumatra)
Risoba samarinda Holloway, 2003
Risoba sticticata A. E. Prout, 1924 (New Guinea)
Risoba sticticraspis Hampson, 1912
Risoba tenuipoda (Strand, 1920)
Risoba thalasscura Holloway, 2003
Risoba trivialis Kobes, 2006 (Sumatra)
Risoba variegata (Moore, 1882) (India)
Risoba variegatoides Poole, 1989
Risoba vialis Moore, 1881 (India to Borneo)
Risoba viridangulata Holloway, 2003
Risoba viridata Bethune-Baker, 1906
Risoba viridescens Hampson, 1914
Risoba vitellina (Moore, 1882) (India)
Risoba walshae Holloway, 2003
Risoba wittstadti Kobes, 2006 (Sumatra)

References

Naturkundliches Informationssystem

Nolidae